"Burn the Witch" is a song by the English rock band Radiohead, the lead single from their ninth studio album, A Moon Shaped Pool (2016). It features a string section playing with guitar plectrums, producing a percussive sound. Radiohead first worked on the song during the sessions for their fourth album, Kid A (2000), and developed it for over a decade.

"Burn the Witch" was released as a download on 3 May 2016 on Radiohead's website, followed by 7-inch single released exclusively in independent record stores. It was accompanied by a stop-motion animated music video that pays homage to the Trumptonshire series of 1960s British children's television programmes and the 1973 horror film The Wicker Man. Critics interpreted the lyrics and video as a warning against groupthink and authoritarianism.

"Burn the Witch" was named one of the best songs of the year by Rolling Stone, Billboard and the Village Voice, and was nominated for Best Rock Song at the 59th Annual Grammy Awards. It was one of the bestselling UK vinyl singles of 2016.

Background
Radiohead worked on "Burn the Witch" during the sessions for their albums Kid A (2000), Hail to the Thief (2003) and In Rainbows (2007). The title appears in the Hail to the Thief album artwork. The singer, Thom Yorke, mentioned the song in a 2005 post on Radiohead's blog and posted lyrics in 2007. He briefly played chords from the song in performances in 2006 and 2008, but told the audience that Radiohead would perform it "when we get the orchestra".

Asked in 2013 about "Burn the Witch" and Radiohead's other unreleased songs, Radiohead's producer Nigel Godrich responded: "Everything will surface one day... it all exists... and so it will eventually get there, I'm sure." He cited the song "Nude", released in 2007 but written 12 years prior, as an example of a song that took several years to complete.

Recording 
According to the guitarist Jonny Greenwood, who arranges Radiohead's string sections, "Burn the Witch" was written with strings in mind. He said: "We left it unfinished on purpose and left lots of room for the strings and we never do that usually. Usually the strings are the icing on top."

The strings were recorded at RAK Studios in London. They were performed by the London Contemporary Orchestra and conducted by Hugh Brunt; Greenwood had worked with both before on his score for the 2012 film The Master. Rather than bowing the strings, the orchestra players used guitar plectrums, creating a percussive effect.

Godrich's father died on the day of the recording. According to Godrich, "I literally left him on a fucking table in my house and went and recorded. And it was a very, very emotional day for me. He was a string player as well so it was one of those things where it felt like he would want me to go and just do this."

Music and lyrics

"Burn the Witch" was described by The Atlantic as an orchestral pop song and by The Guardian as an art rock song. According to Pitchfork, the string section "alternates between sumptuous flourishes and the darkest corners of The Shining's score". The Atlantic critic Spencer Kornhaber likened the strings to heavy metal, "chugga-chugga-chugga-ing the entire time". In the second half, the strings "gradually disintegrate"; while the cellos and basses adhere to a conventional chord progression, the higher strings become "deathly" and "horrid". The song also features electronic percussion.

The lyrics direct the listener to "abandon all reason / avoid all eye contact / do not react / shoot the messengers / burn the witch". Yorke said the lyrics were inspired by the News of the World newspaper publishing the names and addresses of sex offenders in 2000.

Video

The "Burn the Witch" music video was directed by Chris Hopewell, who previously directed the animated video for Radiohead's 2003 single "There There". It uses stop-motion animation in the style of the Trumptonshire trilogy, a series of 1960s English children's television programmes. According to the son-in-law of Trumptonshire creator Gordon Murray, the family was not asked permission to use the style and saw it as a "tarnishing of the brand". The video was conceived and finished in 14 days and released on YouTube one week later on 3 May 2016.

The story homages the 1973 horror film The Wicker Man and depicts mob rule in a rural community. An inspector is greeted by a town mayor and shown a series of unsettling sights, culminating in the unveiling of a wicker man. The mayor urges the inspector to climb into it, whereupon he is locked inside as a human sacrifice and the wicker man is set on fire. As the flames gather, the townspeople turn their backs and wave goodbye to the camera. The inspector escapes among the trees.

Interpretation 
Pitchfork interpreted "Burn the Witch" as a criticism of authority and a warning against groupthink, expressing "dread and skepticism". The Guardian felt it addressed mass surveillance or the threat to open discussion posed by the self-policing users of social media. The Pitchfork writer Marc Hogan suggested that the idyllic rural Britain depicted in the video addressed the rhetoric of family values used by right-wing politicians such as Donald Trump, Marine Le Pen and members of the UK Independence Party. After Trump was elected US president on 8 November 2016, Yorke tweeted lyrics from the song and linked to its music video, interpreted as a criticism of Trump's policies.

The animator Virpi Kettu, who worked on the music video, interpreted the song as a comment on the European migrant crisis and scapegoating of Muslims. The visual style was deliberately lighter in tone than the song, as Kettu said Radiohead "wanted the video to contrast with what they're playing and to wake people up a bit".

Promotion and release

In April 2016, one week before the release of Radiohead's ninth album, A Moon Shaped Pool, fans who had previously made orders from Radiohead received embossed cards with lyrics from the song: "Sing a song of sixpence that goes / burn the witch / we know where you live."

"Burn the Witch" was released as the album's lead single as a download on 3 May 2016 on Radiohead's website and on streaming and digital media services. A 7-inch single, with the 2015 song "Spectre" as the B-side, was released that month exclusively in independent record stores. It was the year's 26th-bestselling vinyl single in the UK.

Reception
Pitchfork named "Burn the Witch" the week's "Best New Track", with the senior editor Jillian Mapes writing: "It's not since Kid A standout 'How to Disappear Completely' that Radiohead have created a song this simultaneously unsettling and gorgeous." Michael Hann of The Guardian called it "thrilling ... certainly the kind of return – bold and expansive, as well as dark and claustrophobic – that the world might have hoped for." Larry Bartleet of NME wrote: "A Radiohead melody has rarely sounded this joyful or indulgent, which puts the disturbing lyrics into especially sharp relief."

Daniel Ross, analysing the song for Classic FM, wrote that "while Radiohead are often held up as denizens of doing it differently ... 'Burn The Witch' is them working smart rather than working hard. They've set up simple confines, but within them they've experimented heavily and made something exceptionally strange, tonally speaking, and inventive to boot." Alex Hudson of Metro, however, criticised the lyrics and rhythm, writing: "It is not the Radiohead of old: taking underground musical movements and turning them into a mass market record ... Here, they sound like they are influenced by the mass market rather than them influencing it." The New Republic writer Ryan Kearney criticised the lyrics for their abundance of common phrases such as "shoot the messengers", writing that Yorke was "the most overrated lyricist in music today".

Rolling Stone named "Burn the Witch" one of the 30 best songs of the first half of 2016. Billboard placed it at number 19 on their "100 Best Pop Songs of 2016" list, and the annual Village Voice Pazz & Jop critics poll ranked "Burn the Witch" number 12. It was nominated for Best Rock Song at the 59th Annual Grammy Awards. Mangaka Tite Kubo, best known for writing the manga Bleach, used the song's title for a spinoff manga series.

Track listing

7"
 XL – 407917

Charts

Weekly charts

Year-end charts

Certifications

Release history

References

External links
 
 

2016 songs
Radiohead songs
Song recordings produced by Nigel Godrich
Music videos directed by Chris Hopewell
Stop-motion animated music videos
Songs about the media
Songs written by Thom Yorke
Songs written by Jonny Greenwood
Songs written by Colin Greenwood
Songs written by Ed O'Brien
Songs written by Philip Selway
Songs about witches
Animated music videos
XL Recordings singles